Mehsi is a High Deployment City and Urban Head Office Kaswa Mehsi. It is a part of the Tirhut Division in the Indian state of Bihar.
The town is the entry point of the Purvi Champaran district. There are many smaller factories manufacturing buttons for the clothing Industry, although most of the population depends upon commercial business and agriculture.

Location
Mehsi is located
Area (2020)	154.12 km²
Population (2020)	207856
Population Density	1348 people per km²
Male Population	108041
Female Population	99815
Nearest airport & distance (Aerial)	Muzaffarpur Airport, 29.54 km
Nearest Railway Station & Distance (Aerial)	Mehsi railway station, 2.71 km
Kaswa Mehsi is an urban part of East Champaran and Nagar Panchayat Kaswa Mehsi in Mehsi consists of total 15 wards.

Industry
Mehsi industry include shell buttons and harvesting of litchi and mango fruits. Mehsi is the major producer of these fruits in India.

River 
The perennial Budhi Gandak river flows near the town of Mehsi which is a tributary of the Ganga river.

Connectivity

Railways 
Mehsi town, through railway, is directly connected to the major Indian cities like – Patna, Varanasi, Haridwar, Chandigarh, Dehradun, Allahabad, Kolkata, New Delhi, Mumbai, Bhopal, Amritsar, Guwahati, Lucknow, Gorakhpur, Kanpur, Ranchi, Raipur, Nagpur, Hyderabad etc.
Mehsi railway station is situated on Muzaffarpur–Gorakhpur main line under the Samastipur railway division of East Central Railway zone.
It is also the closest railway station to Kesaria Stupa, a Buddhist pilgrimage site.

Air 
The nearest airport is Darbhanga airport.

References

External links
 District Administration Website

community development blocks.

Cities and towns in East Champaran district